Mario Humberto García Caboara (born 14 September 1980) is a Mexican football manager and former player who played as a defender. He is the current manager of Colombian club Boyacá Chicó.

García is of Italian descent. He was the first Mexican footballer to win a national championship in Colombia.

References

External links
 

1980 births
Living people
Mexican people of Italian descent
Footballers from Mexico City
Association football defenders
Mexican footballers
Tecos F.C. footballers
Central Córdoba de Rosario footballers
S.S.D. Varese Calcio players
Boyacá Chicó F.C. footballers
Deportes Quindío footballers
Categoría Primera A players
Mexican expatriate footballers
Expatriate footballers in Argentina
Expatriate footballers in Colombia
Expatriate footballers in Italy
Mexican expatriate sportspeople in Argentina
Mexican expatriate sportspeople in Colombia
Mexican expatriate sportspeople in Italy
Mexican football managers
Boyacá Chicó managers